The Myodocarpaceae are a family of plants including two genera, Delarbrea, Myodocarpus.  The family is accepted under the APG II system and APG III systems. In earlier systems the two genera were included among the Araliaceae. Its center of diversity is New Caledonia.

References

 
Asterid families